XPAK may refer to:
 Expansion pack, for a game console
 XPAK, a smaller version of the XENPAK computer network pluggable transceiver